The Punjab Forensic Science Agency (abbreviated as PFSA) is a government agency under the Home Department, of the provincial Government of Punjab of Pakistan. It provides forensic science services primarily to law enforcement in the province. The Punjab Forensic Science Agency act was passed by the Punjab Assembly on 4 October 2007; assented to by the Governor of Punjab on 29 October 2007; and, was published in the Punjab Gazette (Extraordinary), dated 30 October 2007.

Punjab Forensic Science agency management maintains a quality management system to meet the requirements of international standard for laboratories ISO 17025:2005 and ASCLD-LAB International (American society for crime laboratory directors Laboratory accreditation Board) to achieve high level of customer (Law Enforcement agencies) satisfaction.

Structure
Some services the Agency provides are

 Computer Forensic Unit
 Crime & Death Scene Investigation
 DNA & Serology
 Forensic Photography
 Firearm & Tool Marks
 Narcotics and drug abuse
 Latent Finger Prints
 Pathology
 Polygraph
 Questioned Documents
 Toxicology
 Trace Chemistry

References

External links
 

2007 establishments in Pakistan
Government agencies of Punjab, Pakistan
Science and technology in Punjab, Pakistan
Law enforcement in Pakistan
Forensics organizations
Government agencies established in 2007
Medical and health organisations based in Pakistan